Cariló (from the Mapuche word meaning "Green Dune") is an upscale beach resort town in Argentina. It is situated in a man made forest on the Atlantic coast of the Province of Buenos Aires, approximately 360 km south of Buenos Aires city in the administrative division of Pinamar Partido.

Until a few years ago, access to the town was strictly controlled by the ruling authority. Today Cariló is publicly accessible, but comparatively high prices ensure that it remains the preserve of the well-heeled.

Cariló offers a lot of activities to individuals of all ages. The beach town offers sand dunes that attract many tourists for four wheeling. Many hotels and lodges in the area either have All-terrain vehicle, or quads, to rent or are associated with a company on the beach that does it. Dune bashing is a local favorite in the area for tourists and year-round inhabitants.

History 
The Cariló area was transformed from large desert dunes close to the sea to a huge forest and a beach.

In the early 1920s, Mr. Héctor Manuel Guerrero started the forestation of the farm called "Dos Montes". This farm included a cattle ranch called "Médanos" (Spanish for "Dunes") that has a surface of 1.700 ha. Several problems were faced as the lack of transportation and accesses were combined with almost no experience regarding on-sand forestation. Guerrero family decided to keep the forestation up to the sea shore, and included some fruit trees that brought local bird species.

In 1935, this newly-forested area was named "Cariló".

In 1938, the forestation nurseries were moved to the "Dos Montes" farm.

In 1947, more than 660,000 trees were ready to be planted.

In 1948, an estate house called "Divisadero" (also known as "Casa Grande") was built over a dune by the sea with the forest behind.

During the 1970s, all of the forestation nurseries were decommissioned when the forestland of the total private property of the Guerrero family was completed.

The sons of the founder decided to name all the streets of Cariló, using wild plants/trees - for those streets running perpendicular to the sea - and local bird names - for those that are in parallel to the sea - in alphabetical order.

Tourist attractions
Cariló is a beach town that offers many hotels, lodges, cabins, and summer homes to tourists both from Argentina and elsewhere, rather than having yearlong residents. Since it is a hotspot amongst tourists it offers several activities to visitors.

References

External links
Sociedad de Fomento de Cariló

Populated places in Buenos Aires Province
Populated coastal places in Argentina
Seaside resorts in Argentina
Populated places established in 1970
Argentina
Cities in Argentina